Book of Angels or variants may refer to:

Books
Mäṣḥafä Mäla'əkt (Book of Angels) Haymanot Falasha text based on the first part of the Apocalypse of Paul

Music
"Book of Angels" (2005–2017) a composition series of 32 albums by John Zorn performed by various artists:
For a complete listing, see John Zorn discography#Masada Book Two - The Book of Angels
Book of Angels (Machel Montano album)